The 2018 LET Access Series was a series of professional women's golf tournaments held from April through November 2018 across Europe. The LET Access Series is the second-tier women's professional golf tour in Europe and is the official developmental tour of the Ladies European Tour.

The Jabra Ladies Open, held at the Evian Resort Golf Club in France and since 2014 the European qualifying competition for the Evian Championship, became the tour's first dual-ranking event with the LET.

The Order of Merit was won by Emma Nilsson, who in the process also became the first player to secure 4 career titles on the tour.

Tournament results
The table below shows the 2018 schedule. The numbers in brackets after the winners' names show the number of career wins they had on the LET Access Series up to and including that event.

Order of Merit rankings
The top five players on the LETAS Order of Merit earn LET membership for the Ladies European Tour. Players finishing in positions 6–20 get to skip the first stage of the qualifying event and automatically progress to the final stage of the Lalla Aicha Tour School.

See also
2018 Ladies European Tour
2018 in golf

References

External links

LET Access Series seasons
LET Access Series
LET Access Series